The Saint Helena, Ascension and Tristan da Cunha Philatelic Society (SHATPS), founded 1976, is the only philatelic society specialising in the philately of the three Atlantic islands of St. Helena, Ascension Island and Tristan da Cunha.

The society has published a number of works containing specialised philatelic information available nowhere else, including in their long-running journal The South Atlantic Chronicle.

The society is an affiliate (No. AF0085) of the American Philatelic Society.

Selected publications
The South Atlantic Chronicle ISSN 1065-6979
St. Helena, Ascension, and Tristan da Cunha Philatelic Society's Twentieth Anniversary Anthology, Russell V. Skavaril, 1997, 
Thirty Years of St. Helena, Ascension and Tristan da Cunha Philately, Michael D. Mueller and Dr. Peter P. McCann, 2006, 
The Postal History of St Helena During the Napoleonic Exile - St. Helena Boer Prisoners of War Censor and Camp Handstamps by Arthur H. Groten, Russell V. Skavaril and I.D. Lampart, 1991
U.S. Consular Mail from St. Helena, Michael D. Mueller, 2002 
A Diary of the final cruise of the R.M.S. St. Helena to Tristan da Cunha January 15–28, 2004, Ted Cookson

See also
Postage stamps and postal history of Ascension Island
Postage stamps and postal history of Saint Helena
Postage stamps and postal history of Tristan da Cunha

References

Philately of Saint Helena
Philately of Ascension Island
Philately of Tristan da Cunha
1976 establishments in the United States
Philatelic organizations based in the United States